Architecture Film Festival Rotterdam (AFFR) is a biannual film festival screening films, shorts, animations and documentaries about architecture, urban development and city culture. The architecture friendly city of Rotterdam is the natural host if the film festival.  The initiative was formed in 2000, in preparation of  the European Capital of Culture. The festival is characterized as a small, open minded and informal film festival for both architects and laymen. Next to classic feature films as The Fountainhead and Blade Runner or documentaries about architects as Louis Kahn or Frank Gehry, films are screened about the influence of media on the city, the depiction of cities in film and outstanding set design such as in Silent Running.

In 2009 the fifth film festival took place from October 29 to November 1, the 2011 edition took place from October 6 – 09 at LantarenVenster.

Film festivals in the Netherlands
Recurring events established in 2000
Culture in Rotterdam
Tourist attractions in Rotterdam
Architecture film festivals